Craig Stewart may refer to:

 Craig Stewart (politician) (1928–2009), Canadian politician, MP for Marquette, 1968–1979
 Craig Stewart (Australian footballer) (born 1956), former Australian rules footballer 
 Craig Stewart (English footballer), former English footballer and current head manager for the Providence Friars men's soccer team
 Craig Stewart (Jamaican footballer) from 2004 CFU Club Championship
 Craig Stewart (film editor) from Hard Hunted